Techno-pop is another term for the musical genre known as synth-pop.

Technopop may also refer to:

Technopop (developer), an American videogame developer
"Technopop", a song by The Buggles from the 1980 album The Age of Plastic
 Techno Pop, a working title (later re-release title) for the 1986 album Electric Café by Kraftwerk
 "Techno Pop", a song by Kraftwerk from the 1986 album Electric Café (initially known as Technicolor and re-issued as Techno Pop in 2009)
 Techno Pop, a British independent synthpop act of the late 1970s known as Savoir Faire in Europe, who released a version of the Rolling Stones single "Paint It Black" in 1979 (as found on the Cherry Red album Electrical Language: Independent British Synth Pop 78-84)